Terry Wayne Weeks (born December 23, 1963) is an American R&B and soul singer who is currently one of the lead singers of the legendary Motown quintet The Temptations.

Early life
Weeks was born in Birmingham, Alabama. Serving in the Air Force, including involvement with Tops In Blue for eight years. Upon his retirement in the early-1990s, Weeks began singing locally around his home base in Alabama. After giving an impromptu audition to Temptations member Otis Williams, he was placed in a Williams/Motown side project, For Lovers Only. Following that group's only release, he was a fill-in for the Temptations, taking the place of Temptations lead Ali-Ollie Woodson, who was battling throat cancer. He would replace Woodson permanently in 1997, joining the Temptations lineup that included Williams, Ron Tyson, Theo Peoples and Harry McGilberry in 1996.

Weeks sung co-lead on the group's latter day hits, "Stay" (1998) and "I'm Here" (2000).

References

External links
Interview

1963 births
American rhythm and blues singers
Living people
Musicians from Birmingham, Alabama
The Temptations members
American soul singers
American male dancers
African-American male singers
American tenors
American baritones
African-American male dancers
African-American dancers